Rõuge Liinjärv is a lake in Voru County in the southeast of Estonia, close to the border with Latvia.

See also
List of lakes of Estonia

Lakes of Estonia
Rõuge Parish
Lakes of Võru County